Silvina das Graças Pereira da Silva (born 31 October 1948) is a Brazilian sprinter. She competed in the women's 200 metres at the 1976 Summer Olympics.

References

External links
 

1948 births
Living people
Athletes (track and field) at the 1971 Pan American Games
Athletes (track and field) at the 1975 Pan American Games
Athletes (track and field) at the 1976 Summer Olympics
Brazilian female sprinters
Brazilian female long jumpers
Olympic athletes of Brazil
Place of birth missing (living people)
Pan American Games medalists in athletics (track and field)
Pan American Games silver medalists for Brazil
Pan American Games bronze medalists for Brazil
Medalists at the 1971 Pan American Games
Medalists at the 1975 Pan American Games
20th-century Brazilian women